The discography of English singer-songwriter, Bo Bruce consists of one studio album and one extended play.

Bruce's debut release, an EP entitled Search The Night, which was produced by Tom Marsh was released as a download on 12 December 2010 on Bruce's own label, Helamonster. The EP peaked at number two on the iTunes album charts on 4 June 2012, following Bruce's success on The Voice UK.

On 1 February 2013 it was announced that Bruce's debut single would be titled "Save Me", and the album was confirmed to be titled Before I Sleep. Both the single and the album were released on 29 April 2013, with the album charting within the top 10 on the UK Albums Chart, at number 10 and peaking at number 6 in the midweek charts. The second single "Alive" was released on 24 June 2013.

Albums

Studio albums

Extended plays

Singles

As lead artist

as herself

as Equador

As featured artist

Other charted songs

Guest appearances

Music videos

As lead artist

References

Pop music discographies
Discographies of British artists